36 is a sports documentary television show that airs on NBCSN and TSN. The show is a 36-hour documentary series following a specific athlete, such as Patrick Kane. The show typically airs before the spotlighted player competes on the NBC Sports Network. The show is akin to HBO 24/7. On March 14, 2012, 36 expanded to have an episode about Zab Judah calling the show, Fight Night 36. Meanwhile, a 36 episode about IndyCar Series with Tony Kanaan first aired on April 1, 2012. MLS 36 debuted August 5, 2012 following Major League Soccer player Chris Wondolowski during the 2012 MLS All-Star Game. F1 36  debuted on March 29, 2013 featuring Formula One champion Sebastian Vettel.

Episodes

NHL 36

MLS 36

IndyCar
 2012
Tony Kanaan (St. Petersburg)
Graham Rahal (Barber)
Ryan Hunter-Reay (Long Beach)
J. R. Hildebrand (Indianapolis qualifying)
Hélio Castroneves (Indianapolis 500-Mile Race)
Charlie Kimball (Texas)
Ed Carpenter (Iowa)
James Hinchcliffe (Toronto)
Simon Pagenaud (Mid-Ohio)
Will Power (Sonoma)
Oriol Servia (Baltimore)
Josef Newgarden (Fontana)

 2013
Charlie Kimball (Long Beach)
Simona de Silvestro (São Paulo)
Josef Newgarden (Indy 500)
Scott Dixon (Texas)

2014
Kurt Busch ("Double Duty")

References

2010s American documentary television series
2010s Canadian sports television series
2010s American reality television series
Documentary television series about sports
NBCSN shows
The Sports Network original programming
2011 Canadian television series debuts
2011 American television series debuts
2013 Canadian television series endings
2013 American television series endings
Major League Soccer on television